Lafey is a town and sub-county in the Mandera County of Kenya. It sits in the northeast part of the country, at the international border with Somalia.

Location
The coordinates of the town are 3°09'03.0"N, 41°11'11.0"E (Latitude:3.150838; Longitude:41.186401).

Overview
Lafey is the headquarters of Lafey Constituency, in the Kenyan Parliament. It is represented by Hon. Abdi Mude in the Kenya National Assembly. http://www.parliament.go.ke/node/3248

The road through Lafey, which runs along the border with Somalia, is shorter and much traveled, but is less safe than the main road through Rhamu. Damasa Primary School is in the town of Damasa, along the Kenya Somalia border.
Lafey is mainly inhabited by the murulle clan which is further divided other sub clans. Politics in the region is driven by tribal backgrounds thus affecting development of town. Some of its inhabitants are pastrolists who graze their livestock at the outskirts of the town.

See also
 Mandera County
 Lafey Constituency

References

External links
Kenya: Governor Excluding Lafey - Representative

Populated places in Mandera County
Kenya–Somalia border crossings